Nemacheilus papillos is a species of cyprinid fish. It occurs in Indonesia (Sumatra, Java, and some smaller islands) and Peninsular Malaysia. It is a demersal species that inhabits tributary and larger rivers.

Nemacheilus papillos grows to  standard length.

References

P
Taxa named by Maurice Kottelat
Fish described in 2009
Cyprinid fish of Asia
Freshwater fish of Sumatra
Freshwater fish of Java
Freshwater fish of Malaysia
Taxa named by Heok Hui Tan